The Dublin Gazette was the gazette, or official newspaper, of the Irish Executive, Britain's government in Ireland based at Dublin Castle, between 1705 and 1922. It published notices of government business, including royal proclamations, the granting of royal assent to bills, writs of election, appointments to public offices, commissions and promotions in the armed forces, and awards of honours, as well as notices of insolvency, and of changes of names or of arms.

As with the parallel London Gazette, the strapline was "Published by Authority".

History
A Dublin Gazette was instituted in May 1689 by King James II, but after his defeat in 1690 at the Battle of the Boyne its functions were taken over by The London Gazette.

In 1705, under the Lord Lieutenancy of the 2nd Duke of Ormonde, a new Dublin Gazette was founded, although in its early days it was only two pages in length. The earliest surviving copy, dated 9 February 1706, is numbered as Issue 84 and is held in the Library of Trinity College Dublin. While the Gazette was an official publication, ownership of the title and any profits on it initially remained with the printer.

Its first printer was Edwin Sandys, although this was something of a technicality. A proclamation dated from Dublin Castle on 25 October 1705 notified the people of Ireland that - 

Until the 1770s, The Dublin Gazette had less of the character of an organ of government than did The London Gazette. However, on 18 March 1776, an Order in Council was made which banned it from publishing news not "guaranteed" by the government. A Notice subsequently appeared in the Gazette on 13 April 1776, dated from Dublin Castle on 27 March, stating - 

The printers of the Gazette held onto their ownership until almost the end of the 18th century. There was a sensation on 9 April 1799, when two rival versions were published, one by the established publisher, Sir St George O'Kelly, and a second by George Grierson, the King's printer. O'Kelly complained, to no avail, about the expropriation of his interest, thereafter losing the right to publish the title. It is now surmised that following the Irish Rebellion of 1798, and in the year before the Act of Union of 1800, the Irish government felt it needed total control.

Between 5 April and 5 July 1818, the government paid Grierson £570-7s-6d "for Proclamations, News, Promotions, Addresses, &c., published in the Dublin Gazette".

At the beginning of the Easter Rising of 1916, the Gazette published a proclamation by Lord Wimborne, as Lord Lieutenant of Ireland, of martial law. This stated that "certain evilly disposed persons" had "with deadly weapons attacked the Forces of the Crown". The Gazette ceased publication during the Rising and for more than a week following it, with the result that a compendium issue was later published for the period between 25 April and 9 May 1916.

From 1919, during the Irish War of Independence, the Gazette was challenged by the Irish Bulletin, the official newspaper of the rival government of the Irish Republic, produced by its Department of Propaganda and appearing weekly from 11 November 1919 to 11 July 1921. The War of Independence resulted in the Anglo-Irish Treaty, signed in London on 6 December 1921, and as a result the final edition of The Dublin Gazette was published on 27 January 1922. Four days later, on 31 January, the newly created Irish Free State began to publish a new gazette called Iris Oifigiúil, sometimes referred to in English as the Irish State Gazette.

The Adaptation of Enactments Act 1922 of the Oireachtas included the following: 

In Northern Ireland, the functions of The Dublin Gazette were taken over by a new publication called The Belfast Gazette, which first appeared on 7 June 1921.

"Beyond 2022", a website marking the centenary of the 1922 Four Courts explosion by recreating many of the Irish public records then destroyed, intends to make freely available a complete set of The Dublin Gazette, combined from partial sets in various libraries.

See also
 Iris Oifigiúil
 Irish Bulletin
 The London Gazette

References

External links
 Digitised PDFs of bound volumes from the Oireachtas library website (These can also be viewed as smaller files - per individual issue - on the Oireachtas library website):
{|class="wikitable"
|-
! Decade !! PDFs (each c.1000 pages, 1 MB per page)
|-
| 1750s ||
 , 
 , 
 , 
 , 
 , 
 , 
 , 
  
|-
| 1760s ||
 , 
 , 
 , 
 , 
 , 
 , 
 , 
 , 
 , 
   
|-
| 1770s ||
 , 
 , 
 , 
 , 
 , 
 , 
 , 
   
|-
| 1780s ||
 , 
 , 
 , 
 , 
 , 
 , 
 , 
 , 
 , 
 
|-
| 1790s ||
 , 
 , 
 , 
 , 
 , 
 , 
 , 
 , 
 , 
 , 
 , 
  
|-
| 1800 ||
  
|}

Defunct newspapers published in Ireland
Defunct newspapers published in the United Kingdom
1922 disestablishments in the United Kingdom
Government gazettes